Chojnik is the name of a castle near Jelenia Góra in south-west Poland.

Chojnik may also refer to the following villages:
Chojnik, Greater Poland Voivodeship (west-central Poland)
Chojnik, Lesser Poland Voivodeship (south Poland)
Chojnik, Warmian-Masurian Voivodeship (north Poland)